Aziz Maeboodi (born 20 February 1987) is an Iranian footballer who plays for Paykan in the Persian Gulf Pro League.

Club career
Maeboodi has played his entire career with Malavan.

Club career statistics

References

External links
 Aziz Maeboodi at PersianLeague.com

1987 births
Living people
Malavan players
Iranian footballers
Association football defenders